Flann Aighle (died 736) was Bishop of Aughrim, County Galway.

Flann is the first known bishop of Aughrim since its founder, Connell of Aughrim, who lived c.500.

Aughrim was situated in western Uí Maine, though it is not known what blood relationship, if any, Flann had with its ruling dynasty. During this era Uí Maine was ruled by King Dluthach mac Fithcheallach, who reigned from 711 to 738.

References

 Annals of Ulster at CELT: Corpus of Electronic Texts at University College Cork
 Annals of Tigernach at CELT: Corpus of Electronic Texts at University College Cork
Revised edition of McCarthy's synchronisms at Trinity College Dublin.
 Byrne, Francis John (2001), Irish Kings and High-Kings, Dublin: Four Courts Press, 
 Lysaght, Eamonn (1978), The Surnames of Ireland. , pp. 233–34.

People from County Galway
8th-century Irish bishops
736 deaths
Year of birth unknown